Ghazzeh, is a village located in the Western Beqaa District of the Beqaa Governorate in Lebanon.

History
In 1838, Eli Smith noted  it as 'Azzeh;   a  village on the West side of the Beqaa Valley, listed before Bab Mareaa.

References

Bibliography

External links
Ghazzeh, localiban

Populated places in Western Beqaa District